The 1941 Masters Tournament was the eighth Masters Tournament, held April 3–6 at Augusta National Golf Club in Augusta, Georgia. Craig Wood won his first major title, three strokes ahead of runner-up Byron Nelson.

Wood opened with a 66 and led by five strokes after the first round. During the final round, Nelson caught him on the front nine and the two were briefly co-leaders. Wood scored a 34 (−2) over the final nine holes to secure the victory. The purse was $5,000 and the winner's share was $1,500.

Wood, 39, led the entire tournament, the Masters' first wire-to-wire champion.  He also won the next major, the 1941 U.S. Open. Prior to his win at the Masters, Wood had lost in a playoff (or extra holes) in all four of the modern major championships, a dubious distinction since matched by only one other, Greg Norman.

Through 2019, there have been only five wire-to-wire champions; Wood was followed by Arnold Palmer (1960), Jack Nicklaus (1972), Raymond Floyd (1976), and Jordan Spieth (2015).

Field
1. Masters champions
Jimmy Demaret (9), Ralph Guldahl (2,9,10,12), Byron Nelson (2,6,9,10,12), Gene Sarazen (2,4,6,9,10,12), Horton Smith (10)

Henry Picard (6,9,10) did not play.

2. U.S. Open champions
Tommy Armour (4,6,10), Walter Hagen (4,6), Bobby Jones (3,4,5), Lawson Little (3,5,9,10), Tony Manero (9), Francis Ouimet (3,a), Sam Parks Jr. (10)

3. U.S. Amateur champions
Dick Chapman (11,a)

4. British Open champions
Denny Shute (6)

5. British Amateur champions
Charlie Yates (9,a)

6. PGA champions
Paul Runyan (9,12)

7. Members of the U.S. Ryder Cup team
Not held

8. Members of the U.S. Walker Cup team
Not held

9. Top 30 players and ties from the 1940 Masters Tournament
Johnny Bulla, Sammy Byrd, Harry Cooper, Ed Dudley (10), Jim Foulis (10), Willie Goggin, Jimmy Hines (10), Ben Hogan (10,12), Lloyd Mangrum (10), Jug McSpaden (10,12), Dick Metz (10), Toney Penna, Sam Snead (10,12), Frank Walsh (10), Al Watrous, Craig Wood (10)

Johnny Farrell (2,10), Ed Oliver, Johnny Revolta (6,10) and Bud Ward (3,11,a) did not play.

10. Top 30 players and ties from the 1940 U.S. Open
Bruce Coltart, Vic Ghezzi, Andy Gibson, Jock Hutchison Jr., Gene Kunes, Ray Mangrum, Henry Ransom, Jack Ryan, Felix Serafin, Andrew Szwedko (a)

Al Huske, Eddie Kirk (12), Wilford Wehrle (11,a) and Pat Willcox did not play.

11. 1940 U.S. Amateur quarter-finalists
George Dawson (a), Duff McCullough (a)

Ray Billows (a), John P. Burke (a) and Johnny Fischer (3,a) did not play

12. 1940 PGA Championship quarter-finalists

13. One amateur, not already qualified, selected by a ballot of ex-U.S. Amateur champions
Art Doering (a)

14. One professional, not already qualified, selected by a ballot of ex-U.S. Open champions
Jimmy Thomson

15. Two players, not already qualified, with the best scoring average in the winter part of the 1940 PGA Tour
Leonard Dodson, Clayton Heafner

16 Foreign invitations
Jim Ferrier (9,10), Martin Pose

Numbers in brackets indicate categories that the player would have qualified under had they been American.

Round summaries

First round
Thursday, April 3, 1941

Source:

Second round
Friday, April 4, 1941

Source:

Third round
Saturday, April 5, 1941

Source:

Final round
Sunday, April 6, 1941

Final leaderboard

Sources:

References

External links 
Masters.com – past winners and results
Augusta.com – 1941 Masters leaderboard

1941
1941 in golf
1941 in American sports
1941 in sports in Georgia (U.S. state)
April 1941 sports events